Country Road was a countryband in Örebro, Sweden, active between 1973–1984. The band played at the Grand Ole Opry in Nashville.

The band also managed to chart at the Swedish album charts.

Members
Following people were members.

Ann Persson
Lise-Lott "Lotta"Carlsson
Gunnar Norsten
Kent Larsson/Larnebrant
Ingemar Jörhag
Björn "Bjucke" Alriksson
Alfred "Fred" Hansen (gitarr)
Elisabeth Lord
Greger Agelid
 Jan Elander
 Lennart Tybell

Discography

Albums
Something New and Different - 1973
Rhinestone Cowboy - 1974
Here We Go Again - 1975
On a Foggy Misty Morning - 1976
Rock 'n' Roll - 1977
Somebody's Gonna Do It - 1978
Country Road is Back - 1981
On the Road Again - 1982
Too Hot to Handle - 1984

Singles
Never Been to Spain - 1973

References

1973 establishments in Sweden
1984 disestablishments in Sweden
Musical groups established in 1973
Musical groups disestablished in 1984
Swedish country music groups
Culture in Örebro